The Second Sophistic is a literary-historical term referring to the Greek writers who flourished from the reign of Nero until c. 230 AD and who were catalogued and celebrated by Philostratus in his Lives of the Sophists. However, some recent research has indicated that this Second Sophistic, which was previously thought to have very suddenly and abruptly appeared in the late 1st century, actually had its roots in the early 1st century. It was followed in the 5th century by the philosophy of Byzantine rhetoric, sometimes referred to as the Third Sophistic.

Writers known as members of the Second Sophistic include Nicetas of Smyrna, Aelius Aristides, Dio Chrysostom, Herodes Atticus, Favorinus, Philostratus, Lucian, and Polemon of Laodicea. Plutarch is also often associated with the Second Sophistic movement as well, although many historians consider him to have been somewhat aloof from its emphasis on rhetoric, especially in his later work.

The term Second Sophistic comes from Philostratus. In his Lives of the Sophists, Philostratus traces the beginnings of the movement to the orator Aeschines in the 4th century BC. But its earliest representative was really Nicetas of Smyrna, in the late 1st century AD. Unlike the original Sophistic movement of the 5th century BC, the Second Sophistic was little concerned with politics. But it was, to a large degree, to meet the everyday needs and respond to the practical problems of Greco-Roman society. It came to dominate higher education and left its mark on many forms of literature. The period from around AD 50 to 100 was a period when oratorical elements dealing with the first sophists of Greece were reintroduced to the Roman Empire. The province of Asia embraced the Second Sophistic the most. Diococceianus (or Chrysostomos) and Aelius Aristides were popular sophists of the period. They orated over topics like poetry and public speaking. They did not teach debate or anything that had to do with politics because rhetoric was restrained due to the imperial government's rules.

Owing largely to the influence of Plato and Aristotle, philosophy came to be regarded as distinct from sophistry, the latter being regarded as specious and rhetorical, a practical discipline. Thus, by the time of the Roman Empire, a sophist was simply a teacher of rhetoric and a popular public speaker. For instance, Libanius, Himerius, Aelius Aristides, and Fronto were sophists in this sense.

The Sophistic of the second century and the Roman Empire

Introduction
The year 146 BC marks the moment in history in which the Romans conquered one of the first civilized empires in the West.  Ancient Greece is known for its rich culture, mythology, technology and intellect.  In its classical period it was one of the greatest early empires.  After the civilization fell to the Roman conquest, the emerging empire would begin to grow following many of the traditions of the Greeks.  Mirroring some of their architectural styles and adapting a similar religious cult, the Empire held the Greek culture with reverence to its customs.  Throughout its growth, the Romans incorporated the Greeks into their society and imperial life.  In the 1st and 2nd centuries AD, a renaissance of Hellenic oratory and education captivated the Roman elites.  The resurgence was called the Second Sophistic and it recalled the grand orators and teachings of the 5th century BC.  “The sophist was to revive the antique purer form of religion and to encourage the cults of the heroes and Homeric gods.”

In this century, the Roman Emperors such as Trajan, Hadrian and numerous others, held these intellectuals in their high esteem.  Many of them paid patronage to Athens and other Greek cities in the Empire.  Elites sent their sons to be educated in schools developed by these sophists.  The Emperor Hadrian sent his adoptive son Antoninus to study under the acclaimed Polemo in Smyrna.  The Second Sophistic opened doors for the Greeks to prosper surprisingly, in many ways on their own terms.  This renaissance enabled them to become a prominent society that the Romans could respect and revere.  The sophists and their movement provided a way for the Romans to legitimatize themselves as civilized intellectuals and associate themselves with an old imperial pre-eminence.  This movement allowed the Greeks to become a part of the Roman Empire but still retain their cultural identity.

Definition of sophist

Sophism was the revival of the use and value of higher education in the Roman Empire during the 1st and 2nd centuries AD.  This also included a renewed emphasis and importance of rhetoric and oratory.  The practice and teachings were modeled after the Athenian vocabulary of 400 BC, as well as the Hellenic traditions of that time.  The sophists were great lecturers and declaimers who esteemed to address various issues of political, economic and social importance.  Thus, they served a vast array of positions from educational and social leaders, to ambassadors, Imperial Secretaries and high priests.  In these orders, they won the favor of Emperors who would restore their eastern centers of intellect. Some like Lucian heavily favored Atticism (an artificial purist movement favoring archaic expressions), while others like Plutarch favored the Greek of their day.

A.  Oratory

A resurgence of educational value occurred during this time and these sophists were at the heart of it.  They emphasized the importance of the practice of oratory.  Sophists would begin their careers lecturing to groups of students.  As they gained recognition and further competence they would begin speaking out to the public.  There were two different oratory styles of sophism that developed out of the period of enlightenment: Asianism and Atticism.

1.  Asianism

A later sophist who wrote one of the only remaining accounts of these great orators in his Lives of the Sophists, Philostratus describes Asianism as a form that “...aims at but never achieves the grand style.”  He adds that its style is more, “flowery, bombastic, full of startling metaphors, too metrical, too dependent on the tricks of rhetoric, too emotional.”  This type of rhetoric is also sometimes referred to as “Ionian” and “Ephesian”, because it came from outside of Athens.  The historical sophist criticized its form calling it, “theatrical shamelessness”.  It seems that this approach of oratory tended to put more emphasis on form, passion and sentiment rather than prudent realities.

2.  Atticism

In contrast, the other mode of rhetoric, Atticism, is explained by Philostratus as technique that is exemplified by the sophist Aelius Aristides.  He describes Aristides as one who, “usually imitates some classical author, aims at simplicity of style, and is a purist, carefully avoiding any allusion or word that does not occur in a writer of the classical period.”  Atticism drew from Greece’s rich past and originated in its illustrious city of Athens.  This is where the majority of the classic Hellenistic culture was cultivated.  The impressive lectures and declamations of these sophists were based more upon preparation and the studying of information.  Having this basis, they were then able to speak more adeptly about the topics to their audiences.  The sophists generally gave their discourses in Rome or one of three major sophist centers.

B.  Rhetoric

The three main centers of sophism lay east of the imperial capital of Rome.  They were the core of ancient intellectualism; Ephesus, Smyrna and Athens.  The sophists revitalized these cities bringing in wealth, acclaim and foreign interest from around the Empire.  They were the ones responsible for providing benefactions to the city and resolving the disputes of its citizens.

1.  Smyrna

Smyrna was an important Greek city in the Empire at this age.  Two noteworthy sophists were educated and taught in this center; attracting the respect of its citizens.  They also invited the attention or patronage of Roman Emperors such as Trajan and Marcus Aurelius.  Although neither of these men called the city their birthplace, both Polemo of Laodicea and Aelius Aristides spent much of their time here studying the rhetoric or advocating for its people.  Another esteemed sophist in the 2nd century, Herodes Atticus, paved the way for succeeding sophists of Atticism in the great center of Athens.
These three eminent connoisseurs of rhetoric were significant sophists of the 2nd century AD.  Many succeeding them would strive to replicate and illustrate their immense knowledge of the Hellenic classics and eloquent skills in oratory.  Out of all of the Second Sophistic orators, these men possessed significant esteem in the eyes of Emperors.  They also provided their provincial regions as well as other areas of the Empire with an abundance of benefactions.

2.  Polemo of Laodicea

Polemo of Laodicea was the earliest of the trio.  He was born in approximately 85 AD and is the only Asianic orator of Smyrna.  Like so many of the other sophists, Polemo came from a ranked family.  He, therefore, had connections and status with the local administration and it was easy for him to thrive in political and social aspects.  Being from an elite family provided him the means and footing to be able study the sophistic discipline.  His wealth and political connections allowed him to travel and prosper in his role as an expert of robust rhetoric.  Not only was Polemo admired in Smyrna and other surrounding Greek centers of intellect, he was quite popular and venerated in Rome as well.  He acted as a sort of ambassador to the Empire for his area.  Polemo found a great deal of favor in the eyes of the Emperors Trajan, Hadrian and Antoninus .  They bestowed many luxuries upon the sophist.

3.  Herodes Atticus

The Roman elites and Emperors valued the approval and sponsorship of acclaimed sophists.  Herodes Atticus, at one point in time, received up to three letters a day from Emperor Marcus Aurelius.  The Emperor also waited three days in Smyrna for the honor of meeting the student of Herodes and Polemo, Aelius Aristides.  He then was required to wait one more day, before he was allowed to hear him speak.  The man at the supposedly highest standing in the entire Empire was subject to the convenience of a man conventionally considered to be of a lower rank.

Conclusion

It seems that the association and a positive close relationship with these experts of rhetoric were coveted by these imperial officials.  The sophists were held with high regard by those in surrounding regions and even by Roman elites and bureaucrats.  “No other type of intellectual could compete with them in popularity, no creative artists existed to challenge their prestige at the courts of phil-Hellenic Emperors, and though the sophists often show jealousy of the philosophers, philosophy without eloquence was nowhere.”  Not only were the wealthy citizens encouraging their sons to follow the sophistic profession, but nobles were more than proud to claim relation with celebrated sophists.

See also
Sophism
Roman Emperors

Literature
 P. Aelius Aristides, The Complete Works, Vol. 1.  Trans. Behr, C.A.  The Netherlands: Brill, E.J., Leiden, 1986.
 G.W. Bowersock, Greek Sophists in the Roman Empire.  (1969 Oxford)
 Kai Brodersen (ed.): Philostratos. Leben der Sophisten. Greek and German. Wiesbaden: Marix, 2014 
 Jaap-Jan Flinterman, Power, paideia & pythagoreanism. Greek identity, conceptions of the relationship between philosophers and monarchs and political ideas in Philostratus' Life of Apollonius (1995 Amsterdam)
 Maud Gleason, Making men. Sophists and Self-Presentation in Ancient Rome  (1995)
 Philostratus, The Lives of the Sophists.  Trans. Wright, W.C.  Cambridge: Harvard University Press, 1961.
 Simon Swain, Hellenism and Empire. Language, Classicism and Power in the Greek World, AD 50-250 (1996 Oxford)
 Tim Whitmarsh, The Second Sophistic (2005 Oxford)
 Tim Whitmarsh, Greek Literature and the Roman Empire (2001 Oxford)
 The Cambridge Ancient History.  Vol. XI.  2nd Ed.  Cambridge, UK: Cambridge University Press, 2000.

References

External links
 Lucian of Samosata Project - Articles, Timeline, Maps, Library, and Themes
 Livius.org: Second Sophistic

 
Literary movements